Albert Maxwell Butcher (September 21, 1910 – September 15, 1957) was an American major league baseball pitcher for the Brooklyn Dodgers, Philadelphia Phillies and Pittsburgh Pirates from 1936 to 1945.

Career 
Butcher was the opposing pitcher on June 15, 1938, when left-hander Johnny Vander Meer of the visiting Cincinnati Reds threw a second consecutive no-hitter, a feat never duplicated in Major League Baseball since. Butcher was the starting pitcher for Brooklyn in front of an uncommonly large crowd of 38,748, it also being the first night game played at Ebbets Field.

Butcher bounced back from a 17-loss 1939 season in 1941 with a 17–12 record for the Pirates that included 19 complete games. In 1944, he went 13–11 for Pittsburgh and ranked among the league leaders in shutouts with five.

Death 
Butcher died six days before his 47th birthday in Man, West Virginia, reportedly of a liver disease.

References

External links

1910 births
1957 deaths
Baseball players from West Virginia
Major League Baseball pitchers
Brooklyn Dodgers players
Philadelphia Phillies players
Pittsburgh Pirates players
People from Logan County, West Virginia
York White Roses players
Clarksburg Generals players
Beckley Black Knights players
Atlanta Crackers players
Binghamton Triplets players
Baltimore Orioles (IL) players
Galveston Buccaneers players
Raleigh Capitals players
Welch Miners players